Dcheira El Jihadia (Berber: ⴷⵛⵉⵔⴰ ⵍⵊⵉⵀⴰⴷⵉⵢⴰ ) is a city in southern Morocco. It is located in the prefecture of Inezgane-Aït Melloul in Morocco's Souss-Massa region, 10 km south of the region's largest city of Agadir. The 2014 Moroccan census recorded 100,336 people living in Dcheira El Jihadia, up from 89,367 people in 2004.

References

Populated places in Inezgane-Aït Melloul Prefecture
Municipalities of Morocco